Particularly notable classical performers on the marimba include:

A

Keiko Abe
Amampondo

B

Bogdan Bacanu
Daniel Bolgar

C

Pedro Carneiro
Vida Chenoweth
Pius Cheung
Musekiwa Chingodza
John Chellis (Jack) Conner
Colin Currie

D

Dave Danford
Martin Denny
François Du Bois

G

Evelyn Glennie
Joseph Gramley

H

Roland Haerdtner
Bobby Hutcherson

I

Jack Imel

J

Alex Jacobowitz
Ruth Stuber Jeanne
Brian Jones

K

Reg Kehoe and his Marimba Queens
Spencer Krug

L

Joe Locke
Arthur Lyman

M

Gillian Maitland
Ed Mann
Dumisani Maraire
Hokoyo Marimba
Linda Maxey
Luigi Morleo
Clair Omar Musser
Katarzyna Mycka

N

Zeferino Nandayapa

P

Gloria Parker
Robert Paterson
Percujove
Paco Pérez 
Dave Pike

R

John Rae
Steve Reich
Michael Rosen

S

Kathryn Salfelder
Dave Samuels
Leigh Howard Stevens
Gordon Stout

T

Art Tripp

U

Ruth Underwood

V

Robert van Sice * Alexander Vichev

Z

Nancy Zeltsman

In pop music
Spencer Krug as Moonface
Julius Wechter (with Herb Alpert's Tijuana Brass and Baja Marimba Band)
Jack White of The White Stripes
Jon Fishman of Phish
Brian Jones of The Rolling Stones

References

Marimba